Your Place or Mine is a 2023 American romantic comedy film written and directed by Aline Brosh McKenna in her directorial debut. The film stars Reese Witherspoon (who also produced) and Ashton Kutcher as best friends who decide to swap houses for a week. Jesse Williams, Zoë Chao, Wesley Kimmel, Tig Notaro, and Steve Zahn also star. The film was released on Netflix on February 10, 2023. It received mixed to negative reviews from critics, who criticised the lack of chemistry between Witherspoon and Kutcher.

Plot

In Los Angeles in 2003, after an evening of playing poker with another couple, Debbie Dunn and Peter Coleman have sex and spend the night together in her home.

Twenty years later, Debbie and Peter are best friends. He has moved to New York City and become a successful businessman, while she still lives in Los Angeles and works as an accountant at her son Jack's middle school. Debbie calls Peter on his birthday, and they discuss her plans to head to New York soon to complete an accounting program to help her get a better-paying job. Debbie's ex-husband's actress girlfriend, Scarlet, is to watch Jack for the week but flakes when she is offered a role in Vancouver for two weeks. Peter, who has just broken up with his girlfriend and is between jobs, offers to go to LA to take care of Jack.

In California, Peter learns the extent of Debbie's overprotective parenting and decides to help Jack loosen up a little. Peter gets skybox tickets to a Los Angeles Kings game and encourages Jack to invite along two classmates, but this goes awry when they ignore him.

Meanwhile in New York, Debbie attends her accounting classes and meets Peter's ex-girlfriend, Minka, who invites her out for drinks. At the bar, Minka helps her catch the attention of book publisher Theo Martin. Minka also informs Debbie that Peter has written a novel. After reading the manuscript, Debbie pretends to be an editor as she tries to convince Theo to give it a chance.

Peter grows closer to Jack and convinces the hockey coach to let him try out for the team. Meanwhile, Debbie goes out on a date with Theo, which ends with them having sex at Peter's apartment. Debbie accidentally sets off the apartment's remote camera, leading to Peter witnessing them. Disturbed, he goes to a bar and meets an old girlfriend but cannot bring himself to sleep with her. He realizes that he is in love with Debbie.

On Debbie's last day in New York, she passes her exam and unintentionally discovers Peter's hidden mementos of her. When Debbie meets with Theo, he informs her that he has gotten her an interview with a major publisher. When he expresses a desire to continue dating her, she confesses that she is in love with someone else. 

In Los Angeles, Jack's hockey tryout goes badly, and he ends up injured. Peter calls Debbie, and she is enraged that he endangered her son even though Jack appears to be okay. She rushes to leave and get back home to Jack and tells Peter to be gone by the time she arrives.

Peter and Debbie come face-to-face at LAX. After a heated argument, Peter admits that he is in love with Debbie, and they kiss. Six months later, Peter has become a published author and moved in with Debbie. She is an editor at an indie publishing house, and Jack is playing on the hockey team.

Cast
Reese Witherspoon as Debbie Dunn 
Ashton Kutcher as Peter Coleman
Zoë Chao as Minka 
Jesse Williams as Theo Martin
Wesley Kimmel as Jack
Tig Notaro as Alicia
Steve Zahn as Zen
Rachel Bloom as Scarlet
Griffin Matthews as Professor Golden
Vella Lovell as Becca
Shiri Appleby as Vanessa

Production

Development 
The film was announced in May 2020 with Netflix distributing the film, which stars Reese Witherspoon, and is written and directed by Aline Brosh McKenna in her feature directorial debut.

In August 2021, Ashton Kutcher joined the cast. In October 2021, it was announced Jesse Williams, Tig Notaro, Zoë Chao, Steve Zahn and Wesley Kimmel had joined the cast.

Filming
Principal photography began in October 2021. Filming locations included Montague Street in Brooklyn.

Release 
Your Place or Mine was released on February 10, 2023, by Netflix.

Reception
  

Deciders Anna Menta unfavorably compared the film to Sleepless in Seattle, noting as flaws for Your Place or Mine the lack of chemistry between its lead actors, the unnatural feel of the split-screen dialogues, and an apparent absence of tension in the build-up to the pair's eventual reunion.

References

External links 
 
 
 
 

2023 films
2023 directorial debut films
2023 romantic comedy films
2020s American films
2020s English-language films
American romantic comedy films
English-language Netflix original films
Films about mother–son relationships
Films produced by Reese Witherspoon
Films set in Los Angeles
Films set in New York City
Films shot in New York City
Films with screenplays by Aline Brosh McKenna